Scratchy & Co. Was a British children's entertainment show that aired on ITV on Saturday mornings from 6 May 1995 to 25 April 1998.

Premise
Scratchy & Co. starred Elliot Henderson-Boyle as "Reg" and Mark Speight as "Scratchy". Other characters included Annabel and a Scottish girl, both played by comedian and impressionist Ronni Ancona. The main gimmick of the show was that the cast wore "solid rubber wigs" and eccentric jackets. A stylistic similarity might be noted between this approach and Max Headroom. This format only lasted for its first series.

Later series introduced other characters such as Sedgely the penguin and Fathead the football.

From the second series, the show moved away from the original Max Headroom-esque style, into a studio where Scratchy (now minus the rubber wig) sat behind a desk, with Reg behind a window. At this point, guests were invited into the studio and interviewed. However, most of the characters which had been introduced earlier were dropped.

Gail Porter was a frequent guest presenter in the third and fourth series.

The show was nominated for a BAFTA. It was axed after the fourth series in 1998 as part of a revamp of CITV's Saturday morning line-up which took effect that autumn with the launch of SMTV Live and CD:UK.

Transmission guide

References

External links
 Scratchy & Co. on Paul Morris' SatKids

1990s British children's television series
1995 British television series debuts
1998 British television series endings
British television shows featuring puppetry
English-language television shows
ITV children's television shows
Max Headroom
Television series by ITV Studios
Television shows produced by Central Independent Television